Lyonsville is an unincorporated community in Jennings Township, Fayette County, Indiana.

History
Lyonsville was originally called Lyons Station. It was renamed Lyonsville in 1916, in order to avoid confusion with Lyons in Greene County.

Abraham Lyons was a pioneer settler in Jennings Township.

Geography

References

Unincorporated communities in Fayette County, Indiana
Unincorporated communities in Indiana